The Grand Prix Guillaume Tell ("William Tell Grand Prize") was a professional cycling race held annually in Switzerland. It was part of UCI Europe Tour in category 2.2U. In 2007, the race was part of the UCI Under 23 Nations' Cup.

Winners

References

Cycle races in Switzerland
UCI Europe Tour races
Recurring sporting events established in 1971
1971 establishments in Switzerland
Summer events in Switzerland
Defunct cycling races in Switzerland